Miguel Ángel Rubio Buedo (born 31 August 1961) is a Spanish former footballer who played as a defensive midfielder, currently a manager.

Football career
Born in Cuenca, Castile-La Mancha, Rubio played exclusively for UE Lleida during his professional career. With the Catalans, he experienced relegation to Segunda División B in 1989, with immediate promotion, but also a La Liga season in 1993–94 after a 43-year absence (he only missed three matches and scored three goals, but the team went down again).

At the end of the 1995–96 campaign, spent in the Segunda División, Rubio retired aged almost 35, with 530 competitive appearances to his credit. He would coach his favorite club on no fewer than four occasions – only one consecutive spell – being relegated to the third tier twice, and also managed CF Reus Deportiu, Cultural y Deportiva Leonesa, Atlético Monzón, FC Ascó and UD Fraga.

Personal life
Rubio's son, Óscar, was also a footballer. Having been born in Catalonia whilst his father represented Lleida, he too played for that club amongst others.

Managerial statistics

Honours

Player
Lleida
Segunda División: 1992–93
Segunda División B: 1989–90

Manager
Lleida
Segunda División B: 2003–04

Monzón
Tercera División: 2008–09

See also
List of one-club men

References

External links

1961 births
Living people
Spanish footballers
Footballers from Castilla–La Mancha
Association football midfielders
La Liga players
Segunda División players
Segunda División B players
UE Lleida players
Spanish football managers
Segunda División managers
Segunda División B managers
Tercera División managers
UE Lleida managers
CF Reus Deportiu managers
Cultural Leonesa managers
Atlético Monzón managers